Michalis Tzorbatzakis  (born 2 July 1982) is a Greek footballer.

Tzormbatzakis began his professional football career by signing with Ergotelis F.C. in July 2002.

References

https://archive.today/20130217152649/http://www.onsports.gr/onstats/soccer/player/773-Tzormpatzakis-Mihalis

1982 births
Living people
Greek footballers
Ergotelis F.C. players
Kallithea F.C. players
Levadiakos F.C. players
Association football defenders